Vodnik Square is a town square in Ljubljana, the capital of Slovenia. It spans the area from the Dragon Bridge across Pogačar Square to the Triple Bridge.

It is named after Valentin Vodnik, a Slovene priest, journalist, and poet from the late Enlightenment period. There is a monument with a statue in the square commemorating him. It was sculpted by Alojzij Gangl and unveiled in 1889. Across the street from the monument is a path leading to Castle Hill.

In 1895, when an earthquake destroyed much of an old monastery containing a girls’ diocesan college and library, it had to be completely pulled down and the square became an outdoor market now called the Ljubljana Central Market.

References

External links

 
Squares in Ljubljana
Center District, Ljubljana